Spheres: Songs of Spacetime is a three-part virtual reality (VR) experience created by Eliza McNitt and produced by Darren Aronofsky that takes the viewer on a journey through space and the sounds that can be heard there. It was notably the first known VR product to secure a seven figure deal coming out of a film festival, namely Sundance, provoking significant media interest in the state of the VR film industry.

References 

Virtual reality works